"Caviar Taste" is the second full-length studio album by American hip-hop artist/producer Funkghost. The 13 song LP was released on October 31, 2014. on Grand Extravagant Ent.

Background
Principle recording began in the summer of 2013. The Album was completed in the spring of 2014. Funkghost revealed that the album would offer a mixture of Rap/Hip-Hop/Funk/R&B/Gospel/Electro/ and Trap reverberations.

Recording and production
The album was executive-produced by Funkghost, with production from Downtown Music, J Breezz, Epik The Dawn, Paul Cabbin, Scott Supreme, O.P. Supa, 2 Fresh, Tweeknology, Scott Styles and Sean Murdz.

Singles
On January 1, 2014, Funkghost released a song titled "YSL Logo". On June 28, 2014 he released another track titled "Never Go 2 Sleep" which featured Rey Fonder.

Funkghost later announced that the album would be slated for release in the Fall of 2014.

Track listing 

Sample credits
"Swishers/Overdose" samples "Stick’em" by Fat Boys
"Xtra Fly" samples "Touch the Sky" by Kanye West
"Light up the Moon" samples "Stars Dance" by Selena Gomez 
"Stronger Than Before" samples “Ain't That Peculiar” by Marvin Gaye
"Paradise Garage/Tasting it samples" De Ja Vu" by Weldon Irvine" and “Regrets “by TAMAONSEN

References

External links
 Funkghost's lyrics go coast to coast on Caviar Taste  by Jonathan Giddens, published Oct 20, 2014 5:40 pm Spartan Daily Staff Writer
 RESPECT Magazine  Published BY KEVIN AHMADI 10-31-2014 
 DA –What.com 5 finger Discount  Published BY Benja 10-31-2014 
 DJ Booth.net  Published 9-12-2012 By Danielle H.
 Pretty Dirtball Review of Caviar Taste Posted By Pretty Dirtball October 14, 2014
  Pro City Vault Artist Spotlight Published October 24, 2014
  Wednesday Q&A: FunkGhost Published October 22, 2014
  Definition Of Fresh: Funkghost – Caviar Taste Published October 28, 2014

2014 albums